Kate Hasting is a country singer-songwriter from New Carlisle, Ohio. Her group, the Kate Hasting trio, has been featured on the Billy Block Show in Nashville, and was named Country Music Association Emerging Artists for 2015.

References

American country singer-songwriters
Living people
Year of birth missing (living people)
People from New Carlisle, Ohio
Country musicians from Ohio
Singer-songwriters from Ohio